The Mathura Refinery, owned by Indian Oil Corporation, is the sixth refinery of IndianOil located in Mathura, Uttar Pradesh, India. The refinery processes low sulphur crude from Bombay High, imported low sulphur crude from Nigeria, and high sulphur crude from
the Middle East.

The refinery, which cost Rs.253.92 crores to build, was commissioned on 19 January. Construction began on the refinery in October 1972. The foundation stone was laid by Indira Gandhi, the former prime minister of India. The FCCU and Sulphur Recovery Units were commissioned in January, 1983. The refinery was commissioned with a refining capacity of 6.0 million tonnes per year and The refining capacity of this refinery was expanded to 7.5 million tonnes per year in 1989 by debottlenecking and revamping. A DHDS Unit was commissioned in 1989 for production of HSD with low sulphur content of 0.25% wt. ( max.). The present refining capacity of this refinery is 8.00 million tonnes per year.

In January 2009, the plant shut down for a period of time due to a strike.

It is located about 50 kilometers away from the Taj Mahal. It is currently asking the Indian government to allow an expansion, raising the capacity to 11 million tonnes. The refinery also wants to create a new garbage disposal site, which has garnered new outrage from environmental activists because the site will be located even closer to the Taj Mahal and Mathura. The Indian government hired a panel to examine the effects of the refinery on the Taj Mahal. The panel found that the air has high levels of  suspended particulate matter, caused by factory emissions, dust, construction, and exhaust from automobiles. These are causing the Taj Mahal to change color. However, contribution of Mathura Refinery for causing pollution has not been established.

In 1998 the plant was awarded the "Best of all" Rajiv Gandhi National Quality Award.
Presently Mathura Refinery is producing BS VI standard fuels and supplying to Delhi NCR. A corporate MyStamp of the refinery has also been published by the Postal Department for recognising the contributions of the refinery towards environment conscience.

See also
 Panipat Refinery

References

Oil refineries in India
Mathura
Indian Oil Corporation
Energy in Uttar Pradesh
India–Soviet Union relations
Soviet foreign aid
Indian Oil Corporation buildings and structures
1982 establishments in Uttar Pradesh
Energy infrastructure completed in 1982
20th-century architecture in India